The 1987 Schenectady Open was a men's tennis tournament played on outdoor hard courts that was part of the 1987 Nabisco Grand Prix. It was played at Schenectady, New York in the United States from July 20 through July 27, 1987. First-seeded Jaime Yzaga won the singles title.

Finals

Singles

 Jaime Yzaga defeated  Jim Pugh 0–6, 7–6, 6–1
 It was Yzaga's 1st title of the year and the 1st of his career.

Doubles

 Gary Donnelly /  Gary Muller defeated  Brad Pearce /  Jim Pugh 7–6, 6–2
 It was Donnelly's 2nd title of the year and the 7th of his career. It was Muller's only title of the year and the 1st of his career.

References

External links
 ITF tournament edition details

 
Schenectady Open
OTB Open